The  was a major sea battle of the Genpei War, occurring at Dan-no-ura, in the Shimonoseki Strait off the southern tip of Honshū. On April 25, 1185 (or March 24, 1185 by the official page of Shimonoseki City), the fleet of the Minamoto clan (Genji), led by Minamoto no Yoshitsune, defeated the fleet of the Taira clan (Heike).  The morning rip tide was an advantage to the Taira in the morning but turned to their disadvantage in the afternoon.  The young Emperor Antoku was one of those who died among the Taira nobles.

History 

At the time of the battle, the war was not going well for the Taira.  They still had the Emperor on their side as well as the Imperial Regalia which symbolized the Emperor's authority, but had lost much of their territory.  Still, the coming battle would be fought in their home territory with the trained southerners fighting in their home waters.  The Taira were weaker (despite having more ships), but they had the advantage over the Minamoto in understanding the tides of that particular area as well as naval combat tactics in general.  Another issue for the Taira was that the son of one of their generals, Taguchi Shigeyoshi, had been captured by the Minamoto and was being held hostage.  While some of the other Taira generals encouraged their commander to either dismiss or execute Shigeyoshi as a liability, the commander believed in his continued loyalty to the cause after conversing with him.  The Taira also brought the young emperor (who was around six years old at the time) and some of his retainers, dressed in their full court garb.  Directly having the emperor with the army would inspire the troops and show the legitimacy of their cause, in theory.

The Taira split their fleet into three squadrons, while the Minamoto arrived en masse, their ships abreast, and archers ready. The beginning of the battle consisted mainly of a long-range archery exchange, before the Taira took the initiative, using the tides to help them try to surround the enemy ships. They engaged the Minamoto, and the archery from a distance eventually gave way to hand-to-hand combat with swords and daggers after the crews of the ships boarded each other. However, the tide changed, and the advantage was given back to the Minamoto.

One of the crucial factors that allowed the Minamoto to win the battle was that Taguchi Shigeyoshi did indeed defect.  His squadron attacked the Taira from the rear.  He also revealed to the Minamoto which ship Emperor Antoku was on. Their archers turned their attention to the helmsmen and rowers of the Emperor's ship, as well as the rest of their enemy's fleet, sending their ships out of control. Many of the Taira saw the battle turn against them and committed suicide.  Among those who perished this way were Antoku and his grandmother, Nun of the Second Rank, Taira no Tokiko the widow of Taira no Kiyomori.  The Taira attempted to toss the imperial regalia into the sea to deny them to the Minamoto but only managed to get the Kusanagi sword and Yasakani jewel into the water before the ship holding the regalia was captured.  Apocryphally, the woman who attempted to toss the mirror looked into it and died instantly from its spiritual power.  The jewel was recovered by divers; many presume the sword to have been lost at this time.  A new sword was found eventually.  A variety of explanations exist for the sword used afterward: that it was a replica, that it was recovered from the sea anyway, that it was supernaturally delivered or remade, and others; the new sword was enshrined at Atsuta Shrine.

Aftermath
This decisive defeat of the Taira forces led to the end of the Taira bid for control of Japan. Minamoto no Yoritomo, the elder half-brother of Minamoto Yoshitsune, became the first shōgun, establishing his military government (bakufu) in Kamakura. In this battle the Taira lost Taira Tomomori, Taira Noritsune, Taira Norimori, Taira Tsunemori, Taira Sukemori, Taira Arimori and Taira Yukimori, who were killed.

In culture 
According to legend, the heike crabs found in the Straits of Shimonoseki are considered by the Japanese to hold the spirits of the Taira warriors.

Battle is featured in Masaki Kobayashi's 1964 film Kwaidan, in the films third act, titled "Hoichi the Earless". 

The battle is the subject of an opera by the Thai-American composer S. P. Somtow.  Called Dan no Ura, the opera premiered in Bangkok in 2014.

The 2021 animated film Inu-Oh also references the battle in its exposition.

Episodes 10 and 11 of the 2021 Naoko Yamada animated series Heike Monogatari portray this battle.

See also
Shimonoseki
The Tale of the Heike

References

 Stephen Turnbull: Samurai: The World of the Warrior. Osprey Publishing, 2006, pp. 34–38
 Excerpt from the City of Shimonoseki homepage http://www.city.shimonoseki.yamaguchi.jp/seisaku/kokusai/y_english/history/ cites the Battle of Dan No Ura as occurring on March 24, 1185
 Gaskin, Carol, and Vince Hawkins (1990). The Ways of the Samurai. New York: Barnes & Noble Books.

Further reading 
 Stephen Turnbull: Fighting Ships of the Far East (2): Japan and Korea AD 612–1639. Osprey Publishing 2012, pp. 41–42

External links 

 Shimonoseki City Information

Battle of Dan-no-ura
Battle of Dan-no-ura
Dan no Ura 1185
Dan-no-ura